1999 in professional wrestling describes the year's events in the world of professional wrestling.

List of notable promotions 
These promotions held notable shows in 1999.

Calendar of notable shows

January

February

March

April

May

June

July

August

September

October

November

December

Notable events
January 4 – Fingerpoke of Doom
April 29 – WWE SmackDown debuted on UPN
May 23 – Death of Owen Hart
August 27 – ECW on TNN debuted
August 28 – WWE Jakked/Metal debuted on Broadcast syndication replacing WWE Shotgun Saturday Night
September 10 – Eric Bischoff was fired from World Championship Wrestling (WCW)
October 3 – Vince Russo and Ed Ferrera became writers for WCW

Accomplishments and tournaments

AAA

WCW

WWF

Awards and honors

Pro Wrestling Illustrated

Wrestling Observer Newsletter

Wrestling Observer Newsletter Hall of Fame

Wrestling Observer Newsletter awards

Title changes

ECW

FMW

NJPW

WCW

WWF

Debuts
Uncertain debut date
Tank Abbott
CM Punk
Carlito Caribbean Cool
Primo Colón
April Hunter 
Towel Boy 
February 6 – Eddie Valentine
March 2 – Hub
October 4 – Bryan Danielson
October 8 – Brian Kendrick
October 10 - Hiroshi Tanahashi
October 30 – Dave Bautista
November 5 – John Cena

Retirements
 Marianna Komlos (1999)
 Kenny Kaos (1995–1999)
 The Gambler (1990-1999)
 Hercules (1979–1999)
 Jim Brunzell (1972–1999)
 Johnny Rodz (1964–1999)
 Mike Shaw (1980-1999, returned to wrestling in 2006 and wrestled his last match 2009)
 Steve McMichael (1995–1999)
 Takashi Ishikawa (November 8, 1977 – January 1999)
 Wayne Bloom (1988–1999)
 Yuji Yasuraoka (January 5, 1992 – June 20, 1999)

Births 
 May 4 - Hook

Deaths 
 January 4 - Cyclone Anaya, 81 
 January 31 – Giant Baba, 61
 February 9 - Butch Levy, 77
 February 23 – The Renegade, 33
 March 13 – Kurt Von Hess, 56
 March 29 - Herb Welch, 91
 April 9 – Emiko Kado, 23
 April 20 – Rick Rude, 40
 May 1 – Jos LeDuc, 54
 May 23 – Owen Hart, 34
 June 29 - Walter Johnson (defensive tackle), 56
 July 19 - Cavernario Galindo, 75
 August 7 – Jonathan Boyd, 54
 August 9 – Jackie Sato, 41
 September 8 – Brian Hildebrand, 37
 October 6 – Gorilla Monsoon, 62
 October 27 - José Aarón Alvarado Nieves, 33
 November 9 - Wolf Ruvinskis, 78
 November 13 – Tony Rumble, 43
 November 27 – Hiro Matsuda, 62

See also
List of WCW pay-per-view events
List of WWF pay-per-view events
List of FMW supercards and pay-per-view events
List of ECW supercards and pay-per-view events

References

 
professional wrestling